Metro Transit is an enterprise of Bi-State Development,  an interstate compact formed by Missouri and Illinois in 1949. Its operating budget in 2016 was $280 million, which is funded by sales taxes from the City of St. Louis and St. Louis County, the St. Clair County Illinois Transit District, federal and state grants and subsidies, and through fare paying passengers.

System 
Metro owns and operates the St. Louis Metropolitan region's public transportation system, which includes MetroLink, the region's light rail system; MetroBus, the region's bus system; Metro Call-A-Ride, the region's paratransit system.

Bi-State Development also owns and operates St. Louis Downtown Airport (formerly Parks) and the adjoining industrial business park, paddlewheel-style river excursion boats, and the tram system leading to the top of the Gateway Arch. Metro has more than 2,400 employees and carries over 55 million passengers each year.

History 
Bi-State Development (Bi-State) was established on September 20, 1949, by an interstate compact which was approved by the United States Congress and signed by President Harry S. Truman on August 31, 1950. This compact created an organization that has broad powers in seven county-level jurisdictions (St. Louis City, St. Louis, St. Charles and Jefferson Counties in Missouri and St. Clair, Madison and Monroe Counties in Illinois), giving Bi-State Development the ability to plan, construct, maintain, own and operate bridges, tunnels, airports and terminal facilities, plan and establish policies for sewage and drainage facilities and other public projects, and issue bonds and exercise such additional powers as conferred upon it by the legislatures of both states. Funding is received from local, state and federal sources through grant, contract and sales tax revenue. Bi-State does not have taxing authority but is authorized to collect fees from the operation of its facilities. Today, Bi-State is organized as one parent organization with several business operating units including St. Louis Downtown Airport, Gateway Arch Riverfront, Metro, Bi-State Development Research Institute, Arts In Transit, Inc., and St. Louis Regional Freightway. Bi-State Development also has three self insurance funds (Health, Casualty and Workers’ Compensation) that support operations and operates Arts in Transit, Inc. a 501(c)(3) organization that ensures the integration of local art and design in the region's transit system.

Metro was founded in 1963 when Bi-State Development purchased and consolidated 15 privately owned transit operations by using a $26.5 million bond issue to sustain efficient and reliable bus service in the region. Today, Bi-State provides three modes of public transportation services in the St. Louis region: MetroBus, bus operations; MetroLink, light rail operations; and Metro Call-A-Ride, paratransit operations. The MetroBus fleet consists of approximately 400 vehicles operating on 77 MetroBus routes. The MetroLink light rail system has 46 miles of track, 37 stations and 21 Park and Ride lots. The Metro Call-A-Ride fleet has 120 vans which primarily provide curb-to-curb van service for Americans with Disabilities Act (ADA) eligible customers. In addition, Arts in Transit, Inc. facilitates public art programs and community engagement projects.

Bi-State Development expanded into light rail transportation in July 1993. The original 17-mile corridor was constructed between Lambert International Airport in Missouri and Fifth and Missouri Streets in East St. Louis, Illinois. MetroLink doubled in length with the 2001 expansion to Southwestern Illinois College in Illinois and the 2003 expansion to Shiloh, Illinois, home of Scott Air Force Base. The most recent light rail expansion occurred in August 2006 when the Cross County extension was completed. This expansion added another eight miles on the Blue Line through Clayton south to Shrewsbury, Missouri.

In 1987, Metro Call-A-Ride began demand response service to fill a need for alternative transportation service to customers with physical or cognitive disabilities who are unable to independently use regular fixed route bus or light rail service. Bi-State has created programs to educate and certify all paratransit users. Bi-State Development also spearheaded the regional Transportation Management Association (TMA), which consists of private for-profit and non-profit transportation providers working together to provide regional paratransit services.

, the East-West Gateway Council of Government, the region's metropolitan planning organization, is involved in consideration of several MetroLink expansion options for the future, with recently completed projects such as the North County Transit Center, the Civic Center Transit Center expansion, and an In-fill station MetroLink station at the Cortex Innovation Community, which opened in 2018.

Governance 
Bi-State Development was established on September 20, 1949, by an interstate compact passed by the state legislatures of Illinois and Missouri and approved by both governors. The compact was approved by the U. S. Congress and signed by President Harry S. Truman on August 31, 1950. A 10-member Board of Commissioners sets policy and direction for the organization. The governor of Missouri appoints five commissioners and the County Boards of St. Clair and Madison Counties in Illinois appoint five commissioners. All commissioners must be resident voters of their respective state and must reside within the Bi-State Metropolitan District. Each term is for five years and each serves without compensation.

Missouri commissioners 
 Rose Windmiller – Chair
 Vernal Brown – Secretary
 Nate K. Johnson – Commissioner
 Fred P. Pestello – Commissioner
 Sam Gladney – Commissioner

Illinois commissioners 
 Justin Zimmerman – Vice Chair
 Herbert Simmons – Treasurer
 Irma Golliday – Commissioner
 Derrick Cox – Commissioner
 Terry Beach – Commissioner

Funding 

Collectively, St. Louis County and St. Louis City (St. Louis City is an independent city not associated with St. Louis County) contribute 1% in sales tax to Metro, while St. Clair County in Illinois contributes 3/4% in sales tax to Metro.

Transit services

MetroBus 
 
Since 1963, Bi-State Development has continuously provided bus service in the Greater St. Louis Region. BSD currently operates 57 fixed bus routes in Missouri and 20 fixed bus routes in Illinois. Additional special bus service is offered in Illinois for all St. Louis Cardinals home baseball games and the Muny Opera. Bus services on the Illinois side of the river are supplemented by Madison County Transit. In September 2019, Bi-State development restructured all Missouri MetroBus routes in the Metro Reimagined project for increased frequency on central services, but faced local criticism for cutting services.

MetroLink 

Since 1993, Bi-State Development has provided Light rail service in the Greater St. Louis Region. The MetroLink system covers 38 miles from Lambert International Airport in Missouri to Scott Air Force Base in Illinois. In addition the Cross County extension, which opened in 2006, covers 8 miles from Forest Park south to Shrewsbury, Missouri. The overall alignment serves St. Louis County, the City of St. Louis in Missouri and St. Clair County in Illinois. The system has no road-running sections, differing itself from modern Streetcar systems.

The system currently consists of two lines, Red Line and Blue Line which runs through Downtown St. Louis with 73.3 kilometers (46 miles) of track. The system features 38 stations and carries an average of 67,684 people each weekday (FY 2007).

Metro Call-A-Ride 
 
Since FY 1987, Call-A-Ride has provided alternative transportation to residents who have limited access to MetroBus or MetroLink service and/or disabled residents who are unable to use these services. Another important function of the Call-A-Ride organization is scheduling and dispatching paratransit vehicles operated by other members of the Transportation Management Association which coordinates paratransit operations in eastern Missouri. These programs are designed to ensure Bi-State Development meets the federal mandate of full ADA compliance.

Security 
Security for the Metro System is provided by uniformed police officers and uniformed security officers. Other security features include lights at stations and cars, closed-circuit television monitoring, emergency telephones, police patrols of rail cars and stations, security guards at park-ride lots, and radio communication between vehicle operators and MetroBus and MetroLink Central Control.

Plans 
"Moving Transit Forward" is a long-range planning process that will create a thirty-year transit plan for the St. Louis region. The Moving Transit Forward is made up of group of people who bring a broad range of transit experience and perspectives to the planning process. It is headed by Metro's CEO John Nations, COO Ray Friem, Senior Vice President of Engineering & New Systems Development Christopher C. Poehler, and Chief of Planning & System Development Jessica Mefford-Miller. This plan will consist of focusing on service expansion and create jobs for its citizens. It will consists on planning potential MetroLink expansion, considering flex transit, enhance express bus services, developing express bus corridors into bus rapid transit (BRT) lines, and creating high speed commuter rail lines. Metro is working with Madison County Transit and St. Clair County Transit District in Illinois about this plan. Metro is also educating the public about how the system is funded.

MetroLink Expansion 

Light rail has been the most favorable transportation in the Greater St. Louis region. According to Metro, there are over 80 miles of corridors being studied for analysis: Daniel Boone Corridor, MetroNorth Corridor, MetroSouth Corridor, NorthSide Corridor, SouthSide Corridor, NorthWest Connector, and MidAmerica Extension. Some are considered potential future corridors; St. Charles Corridor, SouthWest Corridor, and two Madison County Corridors.

Bus rapid transit 
Bus rapid transit has been also a favorable option for St. Louis. Metro will consider bus rapid transit to be highway based on I-64, I-44, I-55, I-70, or major arterials such as Grand Boulevard, North County, and Kingshighway Blvd. A NABI BRT bus was tested for nine days between late October and late November 2008.

Commuter rail 
According to studies, the routes may run from Downtown St. Louis to Alton, Illinois, Festus, and Pacific, Missouri. There are 80 miles of routes being considered. Commuter rail lines were in Metro's plans in 1994 when voters approved a one-fourth cent transit sale tax, but officials dropped them later because the cost was not worth the benefit and the fare would be expensive.

Urban bus 
Some MetroBus routes are being analysed with the thirty-year plan. It may require a new fleet of metro buses. In late September 2008, an Alexander Dennis Enviro500 bus was tested for nine days.

Flex routes 

There are plans to include flexible transport routes as part of the Metro Reimagined bus overhaul to service routes which were recently eliminated, with Director Mefford-Miller predicting implementation in late 2020 to 2021.

See also 
MetroBus
MetroLink
List of rail transit systems in the United States
List of tram and light-rail transit systems
List of rapid transit systems
St. Clair County Transit District

References

External links 

Metro – Official website for the Bi-State Development Agency
NextStop STL| Official blog for Metro
Moving Transit Forward website – Official transit planning study
Citizens for Modern Transit – St. Louis transit advocacy group
Arts in Transit Website
State of Agency Final Report 2010
Tracking Progress Website

 
1949 establishments in the United States
United States interstate agencies
Transportation in Illinois
Public transportation in Greater St. Louis
Public transportation in St. Louis
Public transportation in St. Louis County, Missouri
MetroLink (St. Louis)
MetroBus (St. Louis)
Metro Call-A-Ride
Light rail in Illinois
Light rail in Missouri
Bus rapid transit in Illinois
Bus rapid transit in Missouri
Intermodal transportation authorities in Illinois
Intermodal transportation authorities in Missouri
Paratransit services in the United States
Passenger rail transportation in Missouri
Passenger rail transportation in Illinois
Bus transportation in Missouri
Bus transportation in Illinois
Missouri law
Illinois law
1949 establishments in Missouri